David Hugh Dunn (born 1 November 1981), is a Scottish football midfielder who plays for Forth Wanderers in the Scottish Junior Football Association, West Region. He has previously played in the Scottish Football League First Division for Clyde and Airdrieonians.

Career
Dunn had a twelve-year career in the Scottish Football League after leaving Motherwell in 1999 without making a first-team appearance.

He moved to Junior football in 2011 with Larkhall Thistle and has since played for Linlithgow Rose, Sauchie Juniors, Thorniewood United, Newmains United, Lanark United, Cambuslang Rangers and most recently Forth Wanderers whom he joined in October 2016.

References

External links

Living people
1981 births
Footballers from Bellshill
Scottish Football League players
Scottish footballers
Motherwell F.C. players
Clyde F.C. players
Airdrieonians F.C. players
Ayr United F.C. players
East Stirlingshire F.C. players
Larkhall Thistle F.C. players
Linlithgow Rose F.C. players
Sauchie F.C. players
Thorniewood United F.C. players
Newmains United Community F.C. players
Lanark United F.C. players
Cambuslang Rangers F.C. players
Forth Wanderers F.C. players
Association football midfielders
Scottish Junior Football Association players